Love Is On The Line is the second single by Polish singer Edyta Górniak, written by Australian singer Kylie Minogue.

Background 

Love is on the Line was originally written by Australian singer Kylie Minogue for a promo called Sessions in 1993.

The single was released in Poland only. The song wasn't released on any album and there is no music video. On 22 November 1999 Love Is On The Line  received platinum award by Polish ZPAV (Polish Society of the Phonographic Industry).

The single cover includes pictures by photographer Adam Krzywka.

Track listing

CD maxi single 
 Love Is On The Line (Radio edit) (4:10)
 Love Is On The Line (Extended version) (6:16)
 Love Is On The Line (No way Jose mix) (5:28)
 Love Is On The Line (A'capella) (2:02)

MC

A-side 
 Love Is On The Line (Radio edit) (4:10)
 Love Is On The Line (Extended version) (6:16)

B-side 
 Love Is On The Line (No way Jose mix) (5:28)
 Love Is On The Line (A'capella) (2:02)

Certifications

References

1995 singles
Songs written by Kylie Minogue